The Austria women's national under-19 volleyball team represents Austria in international women's volleyball competitions and friendly matches under the age 18 and it is ruled and managed by the Austrian Volleyball Federation That is an affiliate of Federation of International Volleyball FIVB and also a part of European Volleyball Confederation CEV.

History
The Austria women's under-19 volleyball team has made a few appearances in international levels, the first was in the 2005 European Championship held that time in Estonia and they finished in 7th place and has qualified to the 2005 world championship for their first time as well and they finished in the 13th place, but since that time Austria didn't qualify to any international championships, They only participate in European Championship Qualifying tournament regularly.

Results

Summer Youth Olympics
 Champions   Runners up   Third place   Fourth place

FIVB U19 World Championship
 Champions   Runners up   Third place   Fourth place

Europe U18 / U17 Championship
 Champions   Runners up   Third place   Fourth place

Team

Current squad
The Following players is the Austrian players that Competed in the 2018 Girls' U17 Volleyball European Championship

Notable players

References

External links
 Volleyball Association of Austria

National women's under-18 volleyball teams
Volleyball
Volleyball in Austria